The 1999 Croatia Open, also known as the International Championship of Croatia-Umag, was a men's tennis tournament played on outdoor clay courts in Umag, Croatia that was part of the World Series of the 1999 ATP Tour. It was the tenth edition of the tournament and was held from 26 July until 1 August 1999. Eighth-seeded Magnus Norman won the singles title.

Finals

Singles
 Magnus Norman defeated  Jeff Tarango, 6–2, 6–4
 It was Norman's 3rd singles title of the year and the 5th of his career.

Doubles
 Mariano Puerta /  Javier Sánchez defeated  Massimo Bertolini /  Cristian Brandi, 6–1, 3–6, 6–3

See also
 1999 Croatian Bol Ladies Open

References

External links
 ITF tournament edition details

Croatia Open Umag
Croatia Open
1999 in Croatian tennis